Moriyama Citizens Gymnasium is an arena in Moriyama, Shiga, Japan.

References

Basketball venues in Japan
Indoor arenas in Japan
Shiga Lakes
Sports venues in Shiga Prefecture
Moriyama, Shiga
Sports venues completed in 1977
1977 establishments in Japan